Grant Wehrli is a former member of the Illinois House of Representatives. A Republican, he represented the 41st district from 2015 to 2021. The 41st district is located in the Naperville area. In the 2020 general election, Democratic candidate Janet Yang Rohr defeated Wehrli.

Electoral history

References

External links
Profile at Ballotpedia

Living people
Southern Illinois University alumni
Republican Party members of the Illinois House of Representatives
Politicians from Naperville, Illinois
Year of birth missing (living people)
21st-century American politicians